The Women's Javelin Throw event at the 2000 Summer Olympics as part of the athletics program went held at the Olympic Stadium on Friday, 29 September and Saturday, 30 September.

The qualifying athletes progressed through to the final where the qualifying distances are scrapped and they start afresh with up to six throws. The qualifying distance was 61.50 metres. For all qualifiers who did not achieve the standard, the remaining spaces in the final were filled by the longest throws until a total of 12 qualifiers.

Medalists

Schedule
All times are Australian Eastern Standard Time (UTC+10)

Abbreviations

Records

Qualification

Group A

Group B

Final

See also
 1999 World Championships in Athletics – Women's javelin throw
 2001 World Championships in Athletics – Women's javelin throw

References

External links
Official Report
todor66

J
Javelin throw at the Olympics
2000 in women's athletics
Women's events at the 2000 Summer Olympics